The Leeum, Samsung Museum of Art is a museum in Hannam-dong, Yongsan-gu, Seoul, South Korea, run by the Samsung Foundation of Culture. It consists of two parts that house traditional Korean art and contemporary art. Museum 1 is designed by Swiss architect Mario Botta and Museum 2 is by French architect 
Jean Nouvel with Dutch architect Rem Koolhaas designed the Samsung Child Education & Culture Center.

Collection

Museum 1, designed by Mario Botta, houses a collection of traditional Korean art, of which 36 pieces are designated national treasures. 
Included in the collection are landscapes and folk paintings, traditional ceramics and porcelain, such as Celadon and Buncheong, 
a bluish-green traditional Korean stoneware. As well as 14th century daggers, crowns, earrings and ornaments; and Buddhist art, sculptures, 
paintings and manuscripts.

Two large volumes, a reverse cone and a simple hexahedral shape, form Museum 1. Mario Botta utilized terra cotta bricks on the building's 
façade.
 
The interior of Museum 1 includes a lobby, rotunda, and exhibition spaces. The core of the Leeum Museum is this basement lobby created by 
the reverse cone penetrating the ground. Museum 2 and the Samsung Child Education & Culture Center are all connected here. Museum goers begin 
and end their tours in this area. Above the lobby is the white walled rotunda. The exhibition spaces in Museum 1 are hexahedral. Visitors begin at the top and walk down 
visiting each of the four floors which house ceramics, swords, jewelry and other traditional Korean artifacts.

Museum 2, designed by Jean Nouvel, features modern and contemporary art from both Korean and foreign artists. Many famous artists such as Damien Hirst, Warhol, Rothko, Yves Klein and Donald Judd 
have permanent exhibition spaces. The basement levels of the museum face the sunken garden and gabion walls. The gabion cages are composed of iron and filled with rocks unearthed during the construction process. The sunken 
garden includes birch trees and ferns.

The main exhibition hall in Museum 2 is a completely open space without any supporting posts thanks to post-tension building techniques.

Rem Koolhaas was charged with designing the Samsung Child Education & Culture Center as well 
as the museum's master plan. The main entrance into the lobby of Museum 1 is through Koolhaas's glass structure. Upon entering the museum, visitors follow 
along on a wooden ramp and pass under a pavilion, demarcating the threshold. Koolhaus used pilotis which not only light the structure but also provide 
a view of the surrounding buildings and site. The skin of the three-story outer building is composed of steel and glass. Inside, a mixing chamber was created 
between the glass wall and Black box and the placement of lighting, piloti and ramps. The Black concrete box holds different exhibits.

Located over the parking garage, the Sculpture Garden showcases sculptural exhibits. The garden consists of a long rectangular strip of gravel and vegetation and the wood deck which frames it. Recently two of Louise Bourgeois’s Maman sculptures were featured in the Sculpture Garden.

Publications
Korea Herald, 9 December 2010
A+U #422, 11/05
Archiworld, Culture, Project Type 9, Seoul, 2005
Arcspace

Dolcevita*, 06
Interni #552, 06/05
Sixty Six World New Architecture 2, 2006

See also
List of museums in South Korea

References

External links
Official Leeum, Samsung Museum of Art website

Art museums and galleries in Seoul
Samsung
Mario Botta buildings
Jean Nouvel buildings
Rem Koolhaas buildings
Modernist architecture
Buildings and structures in Yongsan District